Arnold Dreyblatt (born 1953) is an American composer, performance artist and visual artist.

Biography 
Arnold Dreyblatt was born in 1953 in New York City. His mother, Lucille Wallenrod (1918–1998), was a painter.

He started his studies at Wesleyan University in the 1970s and transferred to the Center for Media Study at the University at Buffalo. In 1982, Dreyblatt obtained a master's degree in composition from Wesleyan University; his thesis was titled, "Nodal Excitation". He studied music with Pauline Oliveros, La Monte Young and Alvin Lucier (at Wesleyan University), and new media art with Steina and Woody Vasulka.

In his installations, performances and media works, Dreyblatt creates complex textual and spatial metaphors for memory which function as a media discourse on recollection and the archive. His installations, public artworks and performances have been exhibited and staged extensively in Europe. Dreyblatt's 2006 sculpture "Innocent Questions", which resembles the layout of an IBM punch card, is installed at the Center for Studies of Holocaust and Religious Minorities in Oslo, Norway.

Among the second generation of New York minimal composers, Dreyblatt developed a unique approach to composition and music performance. He invented a set of new and original instruments, performance techniques and a system of tuning. His compositions are based on harmonics and thus just intonation, played either through a bowing technique he developed for his modified double bass, and other modified and conventional instruments which he specially tuned. He originally used a steady pulse provided by the bowing motion on his double bass (placing his music in the minimal category), but he eventually added many more instruments and more rhythmic variety.

Dreyblatt received a 1998 Foundation for Contemporary Arts Grants to Artists Award. He has worked with Paul Panhuysen, Pierre Berthet and Ex-Easter Island Head.

He has been based in Berlin, Germany, since 1984. In 2007, he was elected to the Academy of Arts, Berlin.

Collaboration
Dreyblatt has collaborated on material with the psych-folk band Megafaun. They recorded an album in 2012 and performed at the third annual Hopscotch Music Festival in Raleigh, North Carolina, in September 2012 and at the Ecstatic Music Festival in New York City in February 2013.

Discography
 Nodal Excitation, (India Navigation, 1982)
 Propellers in Love, and "High Life" (HatART, 1986)
 a haymisch groove, Extraplatte, Vienna (1994)
 Animal Magnetism, (Tzadik)
 The Sound of One String – Previously Unreleased Live Recordings 1979–1992, (Table of the Elements, 1998)
 "Escalator" on Renegade Heaven, Bang on a Can All-Stars, (Cantaloupe, 2000)
 The Adding Machine, (Cantaloupe, 2002)
 Lapse, (Table of the Elements, 2004)
 Live at Federal Hall, (Table of the Elements, 2006)
 Resonant Relations, (Cantaloupe, 2008)
 Appalachian Excitation, with Megafaun (Northern Spy, 2013)

References

External links
 

Northern Spy Records artists
1953 births
American installation artists
American experimental musicians
Living people
20th-century classical composers
American male classical composers
American classical composers
American expatriates in Germany
Musicians from Berlin
Members of the Academy of Arts, Berlin
Drag City (record label) artists
India Navigation artists
Tzadik Records artists
Wesleyan University alumni
Pupils of Alvin Lucier
Pupils of La Monte Young
20th-century American composers
20th-century American male musicians